Lindsey Burke Harris (born November 19, 1993) is an American professional soccer player who plays as a goalkeeper for Houston Dash of the National Women's Soccer League (NWSL).

College career
Harris played for the Tar Heels of the University of North Carolina at Chapel Hill from 2012 to 2016, redshirting during her freshman year. In total, she made 65 appearances and recorded 2 assists for the Tar Heels.

Club career
Harris made her NWSL debut on April 9, 2021.

References

External links
 Houston Dash profile
 
 

1993 births
Living people
Soccer players from Houston
American women's soccer players
American expatriate women's soccer players
Women's association football goalkeepers
North Carolina Tar Heels women's soccer players
FH women's football players
Klepp IL players
Houston Dash players
Úrvalsdeild kvenna (football) players
Toppserien players
National Women's Soccer League players
American expatriate sportspeople in Iceland
Expatriate women's footballers in Iceland
American expatriate sportspeople in Norway
Expatriate women's footballers in Norway